Kelsian may refer to:

Kelsian Group, Australian transport operator
Kelisiun, village in Iran